Macrobrochis nigra is a moth of the subfamily Arctiinae. It was described by Franz Daniel in 1952. It is found in Shaanxi, China.

References

Lithosiina
Moths described in 1952